King Peak may refer to several places:

 King Peak (Antarctica)
 King Peak (British Columbia), Canada
 King Peak (Yukon), Canada
 King Peak (California), United States
 King Peak (Nevada), United States

See also
 Storm King Peak, in the Needle Mountains, Colorado, United States
 Silver King Peak (disambiguation)
 Kings Peak (disambiguation)
 Mount King (disambiguation)